William "Dizzy" Dismukes (March 15, 1890 – June 30, 1961) was an American pitcher and manager in Negro league baseball and during the pre-Negro league years.

Career
Dismukes was a right-handed submariner, who is considered by many historians to be one of the best pitchers in the Negro leagues.

Born and raised in Birmingham, Alabama, he began his baseball career at age 17.

Among his achievements as a pitcher, he defeated the then-major league champion Pittsburgh Pirates 2–1, in an exhibition game in 1911.

While a player, he periodically wrote about baseball for such black newspapers as the Pittsburgh Courier, beginning in the 1920s.

Among the teams he played for were the Brooklyn (NY) Royal Giants, Indianapolis ABCs and the St. Louis Stars.

During his managing years, Dismukes became known for his wonderful memory during his playing and managing, and became known as a strategist. He is credited with teaching Webster McDonald and Carl Mays the tricks of submarine-style pitching.

He spent a number of years with the Kansas City Monarchs, in such roles as traveling secretary and business manager.  Later in his career, after major league baseball was integrated, he was a scout for the Chicago Cubs and then the New York Yankees.

He joined the Yankees as a scout in 1953, having resigned his position as secretary of the Kansas City Monarchs.

He died in 1961, at age 71, at the home of his sister in Campbell, Ohio; the cause of death was hardening of the arteries.

At age 62, Dismukes received votes listing him on the 1952 Pittsburgh Courier player-voted poll of the Negro leagues' best players ever.

References

External links
 and Baseball-Reference Black Baseball stats and Seamheads
  and Seamheads

1890 births
1961 deaths
French Lick Plutos players
Kansas City Monarchs players
Homestead Grays players
West Baden Sprudels players
Chicago American Giants players
Indianapolis ABCs players
Birmingham Black Barons players
Dayton Marcos players
Memphis Red Sox players
San Francisco Park players
Club Fé players
Negro league baseball managers
Baseball players from Birmingham, Alabama
American expatriate baseball players in Cuba
20th-century African-American sportspeople